Indiana University Natatorium is a swimming complex on the Indiana University-Purdue University Indianapolis campus in Indianapolis, Indiana, United States. It also serves as the home of the IUPUI School of Health & Human Sciences (including physical education, tourism management, pre-physical and pre-occupational therapy) with its offices on the second level and the Polaris Fitness Center on the first level. The Human Performance Lab is housed in the basement of the Natatorium building.

The Natatorium has hosted hundreds of NCAA Division I Men's Swimming and Diving Championships, NCAA Division I Women's Swimming and Diving Championships, Big East Conference Swimming & Diving Championships, USA Swimming, USA Diving, and USA Synchronized Swimming Championships, local/regional meets, as well 11 Olympic Trials in swimming, diving, and synchronized swimming.

The Natatorium has the largest seating capacity of any indoor pool in the United States; it can hold up to 4,700 spectators.

Competition pool

The Natatorium's main competition pool is 50-meters with eight racing lanes. Two moveable bulkheads allow for long or short course events as well as hosting water polo and synchronized swimming. The seating capacity of the Natatorium is 4,700, making it the largest indoor pool in the United States. There is also room for additional seating of 1,500 on deck. The main pool contains six underwater windows for television and coaching analysis. More than 100 American records and 15 world records have been set in the pool.

Diving well
The diving well of the Natatorium has hosted many local and national diving events, including the 2008 Olympic trials. It has four 1-meter and four 3-meter boards and five diving platforms of 1, 3, 5, 7.5, and 10 meters in height. There are also two underwater windows for television coverage and coaching analysis.

History
The Natatorium was completed in 1982. Counsilman-Hunsaker served as the design consultant for the project. The architects were Browning, Day, Pollack & Mullins, Inc. and Edward Larabee Barnes, Architects.

The facility was host to the USA Olympic Diving Trials in 1984, 1988, 1992, 1996, 2008, 2016, and 2020. It hosted the USA Olympic Swimming Trials in 1984, 1992, 1996, and 2000. In addition, the Natatorium building houses the IUPUI Recreation Program in the basement of the facility, including the Polaris weight room which was built in 1996.

Popularly known as IUPUI, this facility has been host to numerous other swim events including the 1982 National Sports Festival, the 1987 Pan American Games, 2001 World Police and Fire Games, NCAA Championships, USA Swimming National Championships, and the Big Ten Championships. Additionally, in July 2009, IUPUI hosted one of USA Swimming's most elite competitions, the 2009 ConocoPhillips National Championships.

As part of the agreement for being selected to host the 2016 USA Diving Olympic Trials, the Natatorium underwent roughly $18 million in renovation and repairs before 2016. The project included a new roof and improved climate control. According to local television station WTHR, "the venue cost $21 million to build in 1982, and would cost nearly $75 million to replace."

Notable events
 1987 Pan American Games Modern Pentathlon, Swimming, Synchronized Swimming, and Water Polo competitions (1987)
 Arena (now TYR) Pro Swim Series (2017 and 2018)
 Big East Conference Championships (2009 and 2013)
 Duel in the Pool (2003 and 2015)
 FINA Diving World Cup (1989)
 FINA Swimming World Cup (1988–1989, 2022)
 FINA Synchronised Swimming World Cup (1985)
 FINA World Junior Swimming Championships (2017)
 FINA World Junior Synchronised Swimming Championships (2010)
 FINA World Masters Championships (1992)
 NCAA Men's Division I Swimming and Diving Championships (1983, 1986, 1988, 1989, 1990, 1992, 1993, 1995, 1999, 2013, and 2017)
 NCAA Women's Division I Swimming and Diving Championships (1984, 1987, 1989, 1991, 1994, 1997, 2000, 2013, and 2017)
 NCAA Division II Men's and Women's Swimming and Diving Championships (2006, 2015, 2016, 2019, 2023)
 Pan American Junior Water Polo Championships (2022)
 U.S. Open Swimming Championships (1988, 1990, 1997, and 2012)
 U.S. Olympic Team Trials (1984, 1992, 1996, and 2000)
 United States Spring Swimming Championships (1983, 1984, 1992, 2003, and 2005)
 United States Swimming National Championships (1982, 1994, 2007, 2009, 2013, and 2017)

World records broken in the natatorium

Long course meters

Men
50 m Freestyle

22.18  Peter Williams (South Africa); April 10, 1988

100 m Backstroke

53.17  Aaron Peirsol (USA); April 2, 2005

51.94  Aaron Peirsol (USA); July 8, 2009

200 m Backstroke

1:58.86  Rick Carey (USA); June 27, 1984

1:53.08  Aaron Peirsol (USA); July 11, 2009

100 m Breaststroke

1:02.53  Steve Lundquist (USA); August 21, 1982

1:02.13  John Moffet (USA); June 25, 1984

100 m Butterfly

53.38  Pablo Morales (USA); June 26, 1984

50.22  Michael Phelps (USA); July 9, 2009

400 m Individual Medley

4:10.73  Michael Phelps (USA); April 6, 2003

Women 

100 m Freestyle

54.48  Jenny Thompson (USA); March 1, 1992

1500 m Freestyle 

15:20.48 Katie Ledecky (USA); May 16, 2018

200 m Breaststroke

2:25.92 Anita Nall (USA); March 2, 1992

2:25.35  Anita Nall (USA); March 2, 1992

Short course meters

Men

Women 
50 m Backstroke

27.25  Haley Cope (USA); March 17, 2000

800 m Freestyle

7:57.42 Katie Ledecky (USA) November 5th, 2022

200 m Medley Relay

1:49.23  University of California (Haley Cope, Staciana Stitts, Waen Minpraphal, Joscelin Yeo); March 17, 2000
400 m Medley Relay

1:49.23  University of Georgia (Courtney Shealy, Kristy Kowal, Keegan Walkley, Maritza Correia); March 16, 2000

References

External links

Official website

College swimming venues in the United States
Sports venues in Indianapolis
IUPUI Jaguars
Sports venues completed in 1982
1982 establishments in Indiana
Swimming venues in Indiana